Claudio Moreschini (born 1938?) is an Italian expert in Classical Philology, Platonism and Patristics, often approaching early Christian authors from a literary perspective. After initial studies at the University of Pisa and at the Scuola Normale Superiore in the same city, Moreschini studied at Oxford, notably with E.R.Dodds and Eduard Fraenkel to whom he acknowledges a special debt.

From 1966 onwards he occupied a succession of posts in the University of Pisa, particularly as Professore ordinario di Letteratura Latina, Professore ordinario di Letturatura Cristiana Antica  and as Head of Department. He has worked with the Istituto di Scienze Religiose at Trent and latterly at the Istituto Patristico Augustinianum in Rome.

Publications include an Italian translation of Thucydides, 2 dialogues of Plato for the Budé series, 2 Ciceronian dialogues, Apuleius, Consolatio Philosophiae in the Leipzig Teubner series, Tertullian Cyprian, Jerome in Corpus Christianorum of Turnhout. Moreschini is a major contributor to Sources Chrétiennes. He has also published items concerning Jamblichus and Maximus the Confessor.

Claudio Moreschini is interested in the reception of antiquity, not least Plato, at the Renaissance  and in nineteenth century Italy (Leopardi).

In 2009 he was recipient of the Marcello Gigante Prize.

Publications
A Christian in Toga. Boethius: Interpreter of Antiquity and Christian Theology, Vandenhoeck & Ruprecht (BERG Bd. 003),2014.
(with Enrico Norelli) Early Christian Greek and Latin literature,Hendrickson Publishers Inc. 2005 (Italian original: Morcelliana 1995)
 Storia della filosofia patristica, Morcelliana, Brescia, 2004.

Contributions to Sources Chrétiennes

SC 291 Cyprien, A Donat et la vertu de patience,1982
SC 318 Grégoire de Nazianze, Discours 32-37,1985
SC 358 Grégoire de Nazianze, Discours 38-41,1990
SC 319 Tertullien, Exhortation à la charité,1985
SC 456 Tertullien, Contre Marcion, tome IV,2000
SC 483 Tertullien, Contre Marcion, tome V, 2004

Sources
Università di Pisa/Ateneo 2 March 2010
Sources Chrétiennes, Editions Le Cerf
Teubner
Vandenhoeck & Ruprecht
Morcelliana

References

Living people
Italian Christian theologians
1930s births
Patristic scholars